Orlando Pride is an American professional soccer team based in Orlando, Florida, that competes in the National Women's Soccer League (NWSL).

This is a list of franchise records which date from the team's inaugural NWSL season in 2016 to present.

All stats accurate as of match played October 1, 2022.

Player records

Appearances 

 Youngest first-team player: Haley Bugeja –  (against North Carolina Courage, September 21, 2022)
 Oldest first-team player: Erin McLeod –  (against OL Reign, October 1, 2022)
 Oldest first-team player (outfield): Ali Krieger –  (against Racing Louisville, October 16, 2021)
 
Most appearances

Bolded players are currently on the Orlando Pride roster.

Goals 

 Youngest goalscorer: Danica Evans –  (against Washington Spirit, April 22, 2017)
 Oldest goalscorer: Marta –  (against Gotham FC, October 9, 2021)
 Most goals in a season: 13 – Marta, 2017
 Most goals scored in a match: 2 – (6 players, 11 occasions)

 Kristen Edmonds v Boston Breakers, July 10, 2016
 Marta v Houston Dash, June 17, 2017
 Marta v Washington Spirit, July 8, 2017
 Alex Morgan v Sky Blue FC, August 12, 2017
 Marta v Sky Blue FC, August 12, 2017
 Alex Morgan v Boston Breakers, August 19, 2017
 Rachel Hill v Boston Breakers, September 2, 2017
 Sydney Leroux v Chicago Red Stars, May 26, 2018
 Sydney Leroux v Sky Blue FC, June 16, 2018
 Marta v Washington Spirit, July 6, 2019
 Darian Jenkins v North Carolina Courage, April 16, 2022
 Goals in consecutive league matches: 5 consecutive matches – Alex Morgan, August 5, 2017 to September 2, 2017
 Fastest goal: 1 minute 32 seconds – Sydney Leroux v Sky Blue FC, June 16, 2018
 Latest goal (not AET): 97 minutes 53 seconds – Darian Jenkins v Washington Spirit, May 27, 2022

Overall goals
 Competitive, professional matches only, appearances including substitutes appear in brackets.

Bolded players are currently on the Orlando Pride roster.

Goalkeeping 
 Youngest goalkeeper: Lainey Burdett –  (against Washington Spirit, October 5, 2019)
 Oldest goalkeeper: Erin McLeod –  (against OL Reign, October 1, 2022)

Most shutouts
 Competitive, professional matches only, appearances including substitutes appear in brackets.

Bolded players are currently on the Orlando Pride roster.

Team records

Record wins 
 Record NWSL regular season win: 5–0 vs Sky Blue FC, August 12, 2017

 Record NWSL Challenge Cup win: 1–0 vs Washington Spirit, April 21, 2021
 Record home win: 5–0 vs Sky Blue FC, August 12, 2017
 Record road win: 5–2 vs Chicago Red Stars, May 26, 2018

Record defeats 
 Record NWSL regular season defeat: 
0–6 vs Portland Thorns, June 19, 2022
 Record playoff defeat: 1–4 vs Portland Thorns FC, October 7, 2017
 Record NWSL Challenge Cup defeat: 1–4 vs Washington Spirit, April 3, 2022
 Record home defeat:
0–3 vs North Carolina Courage, June 30, 2018
0–3 vs North Carolina Courage, June 1, 2019
0–3 vs NJ/NY Gotham FC, May 1, 2022
0–3 vs North Carolina Courage, September 21, 2022
 Record road defeat:
0–6 vs Portland Thorns, June 19, 2022

Highest scores 
Orlando Pride score listed first
 Highest scoring NWSL regular season game: 7 goals
2–5 vs Seattle Reign FC, July 23, 2016
3–4 vs North Carolina Courage, May 23, 2018
5–2 vs Chicago Red Stars, May 26, 2018
4–3 vs Washington Spirit, July 6, 2019
3–4 vs Portland Thorns FC, July 14, 2019
1–6 vs North Carolina Courage, September 14, 2019
 Highest scoring playoff game: 5 goals, 1–4 vs Portland Thorns FC, October 7, 2017
 Highest scoring NWSL Challenge Cup game: 6 goals, 2–4 vs North Carolina Courage, April 16, 2022
 Highest scoring home game: 7 goals
3–4 vs North Carolina Courage, May 23, 2018
4–3 vs Washington Spirit, July 6, 2019
 Highest scoring road game: 7 goals
2–5 vs Seattle Reign FC, July 23, 2016
5–2 vs Chicago Red Stars, May 26, 2018
3–4 vs Portland Thorns FC, July 14, 2019
1–6 vs North Carolina Courage, September 14, 2019

Streaks 
 Longest unbeaten run (competitive matches): 9 matches
August 5, 2017 to October 7, 2017
April 21, 2021 to June 26, 2021
 Longest unbeaten run (NWSL regular season): 10 matches, August 5, 2017 to March 31, 2018
 Longest winning streak (competitive matches): 5 matches, August 8, 2017 to September 7, 2017
 Longest winning streak (NWSL regular season): 5 matches, August 8, 2017 to September 7, 2017
 Longest tying streak (competitive matches): 3 matches, July 17, 2022 to August 13, 2022
 Longest tying streak (NWSL regular season): 3 matches, July 17, 2022 to August 13, 2022
 Longest losing streak (competitive matches): 6 matches, August 11, 2018 to April 21, 2019
 Longest losing streak (NWSL regular season):
6 matches, August 11, 2018 to April 21, 2019
6 matches, September 26, 2021 to May 8, 2022
 Longest streak without a win (competitive matches): 15 matches, July 21, 2018 to June 22, 2019
 Longest streak without a win (NWSL regular season): 15 matches, July 21, 2018 to June 22, 2019
 Longest scoring run (competitive matches): 10 matches, July 8, 2017 to September 23, 2017
 Longest scoring run (NWSL regular season): 10 matches, July 8, 2017 to September 23, 2017
 Longest scoreless run (competitive matches):  4 matches, October 29, 2021 to April 3, 2022
 Longest scoreless run (NWSL regular season):  3 matches
September 8, 2018 to October 17, 2018
May 28, 2016 to June 23, 2016
September 8, 2018 to April 21, 2019
June 3, 2022 to July 3, 2022
September 9, 2022 to September 25, 2022
 Longest streak without conceding a goal (competitive matches): 3 matches,  May 8, 2016 to May 28, 2016
 Longest streak without conceding a goal (NWSL regular season): 3 matches,  May 8, 2016 to May 28, 2016
 Longest streak without a shutout (competitive matches): 24 matches, June 27, 2018 to July 20, 2019
 Longest streak without a shutout (NWSL regular season): 24 matches, June 27, 2018 to July 20, 2019

Coaching records 

 First head coach: Tom Sermanni – Sermanni was named as Orlando Pride's first head coach when the team's expansion was announced in October 2015.
 Longest-serving head coach: Tom Sermanni –  (69 matches) (October 20, 2015 to 14 September, 2018)

List of seasons

Individual honors 

NWSL Player of the Month

NWSL Team of the Year

The Best FIFA Women's Player
The following players have won The Best FIFA Women's Player award while playing for Orlando Pride:
 Marta – 2018

FIFPro Women's World 11
The following players were named to the FIFPro Women's World 11 while playing for Orlando Pride:
 Alex Morgan (4) – 2016, 2017, 2019, 2021
 Marta (3) – 2017, 2019, 2021

Internationals

Caps 
Below is a list of players capped internationally while with Orlando Pride and the number of caps they earned during that time. A total of 23 players have represented 11 different senior national teams during their Orlando Pride tenure.

Note: Countries indicate national team as defined under FIFA eligibility rules. Players may hold more than one non-FIFA nationality.

Bolded players are currently on the Orlando Pride roster.

Honors
Below is a list of major international honors won by players while with Orlando Pride.

FIFA Women's World Cup
The following players have won the FIFA Women's World Cup while playing for Orlando Pride:
 Ashlyn Harris – 2019
 Ali Krieger – 2019
 Alex Morgan – 2019

Olympic Games
The following players have won the Olympic gold medal while playing for Orlando Pride:
 Erin McLeod – 2020

NWSL Draft picks
Below is a list of players Orlando Pride has selected in an NWSL Draft (formerly NWSL College Draft). A total of 28 players have been drafted by Orlando.

Bolded players are currently on the Orlando Pride roster.

Record by opponent

National Women's Soccer League

Regular season

Playoffs 
Orlando Pride's first, and so far only, playoff appearance was in 2017 after the team had finished the regular season in third-place.

NWSL Challenge Cup 
The NWSL Challenge Cup was first held in 2020 as a single-site replacement tournament to the regular season schedule in response to the difficulties posed by the COVID-19 pandemic to playing a full season. Orlando Pride withdrew from the tournament after multiple positive cases in the squad prior to the start of the tournament. They first contested the Challenge Cup in 2021.

Other

2020 Fall Series 
To compensate for the lack of competitive schedule and difficulty of travel during the COVID-19 pandemic, the NWSL grouped the nine teams into three regional pods of three to allow for a Fall Series in September and October. Within each pod, the teams played a four-game, home-and-away schedule with the overall winner awarded the Community Shield. Orlando were grouped in the south region with reigning NWSL champions North Carolina and 2020 NWSL Challenge Cup winners Houston. The results of those games are listed below:

References 

Orlando Pride
Orlando, Florida-related lists
Orlando Pride
Orlando Pride records and statistics